Les Vignes is a former commune in the Lozère department in southern France. On 1 January 2017, it was merged into the new commune Massegros Causses Gorges. Its population was 81 in 2019.

See also
Communes of the Lozère department
Causse Méjean

References

Vignes